Proserpinus clarkiae, or Clark's sphinx, is a moth of the family Sphingidae. The species was first described by Jean Baptiste Boisduval in 1852. It is known from British Columbia and Washington south through California to Baja California, east to Idaho, Wyoming and Utah. The habitat consists of oak woodland and pine-oak woodland in foothills.

Description 
The wingspan is 30–38 mm. The forewing underside basal orange colour is vestigial or absent. The hindwing upperside is pale orange or yellowish and the marginal band of the hindwing is black.

Biology 

Adults are on wing from mid-March to June in one generation per year. They feed on the nectar of various flowers, including Salvia columbariae, Asclepias cordifolia, Ribes aureum, Dipterostemon capitatus, Clarkia, Vicia, Cirsium and Stachys species.

The larvae feed on Clarkia unguiculata.

References

External links

"Proserpinus clarkiae (Boisduval, 1852)". Sphingidae of the Americas. Retrieved December 6, 2018.

Proserpinus
Moths of North America
Natural history of the California chaparral and woodlands
Moths described in 1852